Frank Emmelmann (born 15 September 1961 in Groß Börnecke, Saxony-Anhalt) is a retired East German sprinter who specialized in the 100 and 200 metres.

Biography
In 1981, Emmelmann finished 2nd in the European cup final in the 100 metres to the 1980 Moscow Olympic 100 metre Champion Allan Wells. Emmelmann went on to win the European cup 200 metres afterwards. Then, Emmelmann finished 3rd in the 100/200 in the "IAAF World cup" in Rome also that year.

At the 1982 European Championships, Emmelmann won the 100 metres and finished third in the 200 metres. In the 4 x 100 metres relay, he won a silver medal with teammates Thomas Munkelt, Detlef Kübeck and Olaf Prenzler. 

At the 1986 European Championships Emmelmann made the 200 metre final in Stuttgart where he finished 8th, but won a silver medal in the 4 x 100 metres relay with teammates Thomas Schröder, Steffen Bringmann and Olaf Prenzler.

In 1983, Emmelmann won the European cup final 100 metres in London, then went on to finish 5th in the 200 metre final at the "IAAF World Championships" in Helsinki. He competed in the 100m as well, but did not make it past the semi final.

Emmelmann represented the sports team SC Magdeburg and became East German 100 meter champion in 1981, 1982 and 1985 and 200 meter champion in 1981, 1984, 1985, 1987 and 1988.

His personal 100 meter best time of 10.06 seconds, achieved in June 1986 in Berlin, remained the German record until 2014 when Julian Reus clocked 10.05 seconds during the German Athletics Championships in Ulm. His personal 200 meter best time of 20.23 seconds, achieved in August 1985 in Moscow, was the German record until July 2005, when Tobias Unger ran in 20.20.

In 1991, Emmelmann attempted to become a professional American football player, trying out for the WLAF's inaugural season, but later backed out before joining a team.

Emmelmann is married to Kirsten Emmelmann, née Siemon.

See also
 German all-time top lists – 100 metres
 German all-time top lists – 200 metres

References

External links
 

1961 births
Living people
People from Salzlandkreis
East German male sprinters
European Athletics Championships medalists
Sportspeople from Saxony-Anhalt